Saphir VE231 (French, meaning sapphire) was a French sounding rocket. It was part of the "pierres précieuses" ("precious stones") family of launch vehicles.

Saphir was launched 15 times, from July 5, 1965, to January 27, 1967. The Diamant rocket, which carried the first French satellite, Asterix-1, into orbit, was developed from the Saphir with the addition of a third stage. After the successful launch of Diamant, Saphir rockets were used to test technologies for France's burgeoning intercontinental ballistic missile development—namely radio and inertial guidance, warhead separation, and ablative heat shielding of a re-entry vehicle.

See also 
 French space program
 Veronique (rocket)

References

Experimental rockets
Sounding rockets of France
Space launch vehicles of France